Zaloke is a settlement in the Municipality of Krško in eastern Slovenia. The motorway from Ljubljana to Zagreb crosses the territory of Zaloke. The area is part of the traditional region of Lower Carniola. It is now included with the rest of the municipality in the Lower Sava Statistical Region.

References

External links
Zaloke on Geopedia

Populated places in the Municipality of Krško